Waleed El Ahmady is an Egyptian bridge player.

Bridge accomplishments

Wins

 North American Bridge Championships (4)
 Blue Ribbon Pairs (1) 2004 
 Mitchell Board-a-Match Teams (1) 2012 
 Vanderbilt (1) 2009 
 von Zedtwitz Life Master Pairs (1) 2004

Runners-up

 Cavendish Invitational Pairs (2) 2002, 2003
 North American Bridge Championships (3)
 Chicago Mixed Board-a-Match (1) 2006 
 Roth Open Swiss Teams (1) 2008 
 von Zedtwitz Life Master Pairs (1) 2005

Notes

External links

Egyptian contract bridge players